The ambassador of the Kingdom of England to France (French: l'ambassadeur anglais en France) was the foremost diplomatic representative of the historic Kingdom of England in France, before the creation of the Kingdom of Great Britain in 1707.

The position was not a continuous one, and there was sometimes no diplomatic representation, due to wars between the two countries.

English ambassadors and Ministers to France

Before 1602

Sir Charles Somerset 1505
1514–1515: Charles Brandon, 1st Duke of Suffolk
1518–1521: Thomas Boleyn, 1st Earl of Wiltshire
1529-?: Charles Brandon, 1st Duke of Suffolk
Periods in 1540s and 1550s: Nicholas Wotton
1559–1564: Sir Nicolas Throckmorton
1564–1566: Sir Thomas Smith
1566: Sir Thomas Hoby 
1566–1570: Henry Norris, 1st Baron Norreys
1570–1573: Sir Francis Walsingham
1573–1576: Valentine Dale
1576–1579: Sir Amias Paulet
1579–1583: Sir Henry Cobham (Henry Brooke)
1583–1590: Sir Edward Stafford
1591–1592: Sir Henry Unton
1592–1596: Sir Thomas Esmondes Chargé d'affaires
1596–1597: Sir Anthony Mildmay
1597–1599:Sir Thomas Esmondes Chargé d'affaires
1599–1600: Sir Henry Neville
1601 Sir Thomas Esmondes, Special Ambassador

1602–1689
1602–1606: Sir Thomas Parry
1604: Sir James Hay, 1st Earl of Carlisle
1604–1605: The Duke of Lennox and Richmond
1605–1609: Sir George Carew Resident ambassador
1606: Sir William Godolphin
1609–1610: William Beecher Chargé d'Affaires
1610–1617: Thomas Edmondes Resident Ambassador 
1610: Edward Wotton, 1st Baron Wotton
1616: Sir James Hay, 1st Earl of Carlisle
1617–1619: William Beecher Agent (Chargé d'Affaires)
1619–1624: Sir Edward Herbert, 1st Baron Herbert of Cherbury Resident Ambassador (but not Sept 1621 to June 1622)
1621–1622: James Hay, Viscount Doncaster
1624–1625: Henry Rich, 1st Earl of Holland
1624–1625: James Hay, 1st Earl of Carlisle
1624–1625: Sir George Goring, 1st Earl of Norwich Agent
1625: George Villiers, 1st Duke of Buckingham
1625–1627: Sir Edward Barrett, 1st Lord Barrett of Newburgh appointed Resident Ambassador, but did not go
1625: Thomas Lorkin Agent
1625–1626: Henry Rich, 1st Earl of Holland and Sir Dudley Carleton
1626–1627: William Lewis Agent
1626: Dudley Carleton, Lord Carleton
1626: Walter Montagu
1626–1627: John Hawkins
1627–1628: Walter Montagu
1629–1630: Thomas Edmonds, Special mission
1629–1640: Réné Augier Agent (with de Vic)
1630–1636: Henry de Vic Agent or Chargé d'affaires when there was no ambassador
1630–1631: Walter Montagu Ambassador (3 special missions)
1631–1632: Sir Isaac Wake
1631–1633: Jerome Weston Special Mission
1635–1639: John Scudamore, 1st Viscount Scudamore Ambassador Ordinary
1636–1641: Robert Sidney, 2nd Earl of Leicester Ambassador Extraordinary
1639–1640:  Thomas Windebank
1641–1650: Richard Browne Agent (for Charles I, then representing the exiled Charles II)
1642–1643: William Kerr, 3rd Earl of Lothian (for Scots Privy Council and Charles I)
1643–1644: George Goring, Lord Goring (for Charles I)
1644–1651: Réné Augier Agent; then Resident Ambassador (for Parliament)
1651–1655: Réné Petit Agent
1655–1656: Réné Augier Agent
1656–1659: Sir William Lockhart Ambassador
1658: Thomas Belasyse, Viscount Fauconberg
1660: William Crofts, 1st Baron Crofts Ambassador Extraordinary
1660–1661: Henry Jermyn, Earl of St Albans Ambassador Extraordinary
1661: Samuel Tuke Ambassador Extraordinary
1661-?: William Crofts, 1st Baron Crofts and Laurence Hyde Special Ambassadors
1662: Henry Jermyn, Earl of St Albans Ambassador Extraordinary
1662–1663: Ralph Montagu Agent?
1662–1666: Denzil Holles, 1st Baron Holles Ambassador Extraordinary
1666–1668: Henry Jermyn, Earl of St Albans
1668: Sir John Trevor
1669–1672: Ralph Montagu
1669 and 1670: Charles Sackville, Baron Buckhurst
1670: George Villiers, 2nd Duke of Buckingham
1671: John Belasyse, Baron Belasyse
1671 and 1672: Sidney Godolphin
1672–1677: William Perwich Agent (and Chargé d'affaires when no ambassador)
1672: Henry Savile, Ambassador
1672: Thomas Butler, 6th Earl of Ossory
1672–1673: Robert Spencer, 2nd Earl of Sunderland
1673: Sir Edward Spragge
1673–1675: Sir William Lockhart
1673: Henry Mordaunt, 2nd Earl of Peterborough, 'made diplomatic contact in France, Apr. 1673, on his way to the Emperor'
1674: Bevil Skelton Secret Mission
1675–1676: John Berkeley, 1st Baron Berkeley of Stratton Ambassador Extraordinary
1676–1678: Ralph Montagu Ambassador Extraordinary
1676–1679: John Brisbane Agent; and then Chargé d'affaires
1677: Louis Duras, 2nd Earl of Feversham Special Ambassador
1678–1679: Robert Spencer, 2nd Earl of Sunderland Ambassador Extraordinary
1679–1682: Henry Savile, Envoy Extraordinary
1682–1685: Richard Graham, 1st Viscount Preston, Envoy Extraordinary
1682: Louis de Duras, 2nd Earl of Feversham, Ambassador Extraordinary'
1683: George Douglas, 1st Earl of Dumbarton Special Ambassador
1683–1684: James Hamilton, Earl of Arran Ambassador Extraordinary
1685: John Churchill, Baron Churchill Ambassador Extraordinary
1685–1686: Sir William Trumbull Ambassador Extraordinary
1686–1688: Bevil Skelton Envoy Extraordinary
1688–1689: Henry Waldegrave, 1st Baron Waldegrave Envoy Extraordinary

Ambassadors Extraordinary, from 1689
No representation 1689–1697 due to the Nine Years' War
1697–1698: The Earl of Portland
1698–1699: The Earl of Jersey
1699–1701: The Earl of Manchester
No representation from 1701 to 1712, due to the War of the Spanish Succession

After the Union of England and Scotland
In 1707 the Kingdom of England became part of the new Kingdom of Great Britain. For missions from the court of St James's after 1707, see List of ambassadors of Great Britain to France.

References

France
England